The fast track is an informal English term meaning "the quickest and most direct route to achievement of a goal, as in competing for professional advancement". By definition, it implies that a less direct, slower route also exists.

Fast track or Fast Track may also refer to:

 FDA Fast Track Development Program, FDA granted Fast Track Designation for investigational drugs
 Fast Track, a FoxBusiness.com show hosted by Anna Gilligan
 Fast Track (UK TV series), a travel programme
 Fast Track (U.S. TV series), a 1997 U.S. TV series that aired on Showtime
 "Fast Track", a song by Radiohead, it features as a b-side to the "Pyramid Song" single
 Fast Track, a common term for a HyperLink
 Fast Track, the working title of The Ex (2007 film)
 Dedicated security and immigration lines at some British airports; see Business Class or First class (aviation)
 Fast Track (company), an American device management company
 Fast Track (magazine), an Indian information technology monthly
 Fast track (trade), the authority of the President of the United States to negotiate agreements with the Congress
 Fast Track, a defunct drive-through hamburger chain formerly located in Baton Rouge, Louisiana.
 Fast Track (Warner Bros. Movie World), a virtual queuing system in seasonal operation at Warner Bros. Movie World
 Fast Track (Wet'n'Wild Water World), a virtual queuing system in seasonal operation at Wet'n'Wild Water World
 Fast Track, a sports sponsorship agency that is part of Chime Communications plc.
 Fast Track, the UK-based research company that produces the Sunday Times Fast Track 100 list.
 Fast-track construction, a scheduling technique   
 FastTrack, a peer-to-peer protocol
 Fasttrack (Transformers), a fictional character
 FastTrack Schedule, a project management software program that is used for planning, tracking, and reporting project goals
 FastTrack Scripting Host, a software product (Windows operating systems)
 Fast Track, the alter ego of Meena Dhawan, a DC Comics character

Other uses
 Fastrack (bus), A bus rapid transit scheme operating in the Thames Gateway area of Kent. operated by Arriva Southern Counties.
Fastrack (fashion accessories), a brand of watches and accessories by Titan Company.
 On the Fastrack, a comic strip by Bill Holbrook
 FasTrak, an electronic toll collection system in California
 Fasttrack, a Ben 10 alien who makes his debut in Ultimate Alien
 JCB Fastrac, type of JCB tractor that will travel up to 60 mph.
 FASTRACK, a maintenance program in the New York City Subway
 FasTracks, an expansion plan for public transportation in Denver

See also
 Fastrac (disambiguation)
 Fastrack (disambiguation)